Ai Suzuki (born 9 May 1994) is a Japanese professional golfer.

Suzuki plays on the LPGA of Japan Tour where she has won 17 times including 7 times in 2019. In November 2019, she won three consecutive tournaments, including the Toto Japan Classic, which was co-sanctioned by the LPGA Tour.

Suzuki led the LPGA of Japan Tour money list in 2017 and 2019.

Professional wins (19)

LPGA of Japan Tour wins (17)

Tournaments in bold denotes major tournaments in LPGA of Japan Tour.
Co-sanctioned by the LPGA Tour.

LPGA Tour wins (1)

Co-sanctioned by the LPGA of Japan Tour.

JLPGA Step up Tour (2)
2013 (1) Chugoku Shimbun Chupea Ladies Cup
2014 (1) Rashinkin Ninjineer/RKB Ladies

Results in LPGA majors
Results not in chronological order before 2019.

CUT = missed the half-way cut
WD = withdrew
NT = no tournament
T = tied

Summary

 Most consecutive cuts made – 2 (three times)
 Longest streak of top-10s – 0

Team appearances
The Queens (representing Japan): 2016
International Crown (representing Japan): 2016

References

External links

Japanese female golfers
LPGA of Japan Tour golfers
Sportspeople from Tokushima Prefecture
1994 births
Living people
21st-century Japanese women